Scottish court may refer to:

Courts of Scotland, Scottish courts of law
Royal Court of Scotland, the court of the Kingdom of Scotland